Field is a neighborhood in the Nokomis community in south Minneapolis, Minnesota. The neighborhood is bordered by East 46th Street on the north, Chicago Avenue on the east, Minnehaha Parkway on the south, and Interstate 35W on the west. Field shares a neighborhood organization with the Regina and Northrop neighborhoods.

Field takes its name from a local school, which in turn was named for Eugene Field, a writer of children's poetry. The largely-residential neighborhood is characterized by small, two-bedroom, pre-1940s homes made from stucco, brick, and stone. Chicago Avenue is the main commercial thoroughfare in the neighborhood. Field is home to the Arthur and Edith Lee House historic place.

References

External links
Minneapolis Neighborhood Profile - Field
Field Regina Northrop Neighborhood Group

Neighborhoods in Minneapolis